Bond sheep are an Australian sheep breed that was developed around 1909 near Lockhart, New South Wales by Thomas Bond when he mated Saxon-Peppin Merino ewes to stud Lincoln rams for primarily wool production. The resulting progeny was selected on the basis that they would be more suited to the Riverina environment. Initially these sheep were known as ‘the Commercial Corriedale’.

In 1979, the name was changed to Bond and the Bond Sheepbreeders Association was formed at Lockhart in 1984.

Stud rams may weigh up to  under good conditions. High lambing percentages are common.

The breed is quite common in the south-east areas of Australia. Stud animals have been exported to China, New Zealand and Russia.

References

Stephens, M (et al.), Handbook of Australian Livestock, Australian Meat & Livestock Export Corporation, 2000 (4th ed),

External links
 Australian Bond Sheep Breeders Association

Sheep breeds originating in Australia
Sheep breeds